Paza is an alternative name for the Iranian town of Razeh, South Khorasan.

Paza may also refer to:

 PAZA, the Anchorage Air Route Traffic Control Center
 Paza language, a Loloish language of northern Laos
 Paza, DRC, a town in the Democratic Republic of Congo once controlled by the Katanga insurgency
 PAZA (Press Association of Zambia), an organization concerned with freedom of the press in Zambia
 Paza Rahm, musician on Beck’s 2005 EP Hell Yes

See also
 Jachcha Paza, an archaeological site in Bolivia